Jociel Ferreira da Silva (born March 31, 1982), shortly Ciel, is a Brazilian professional footballer who plays as a forward for Tombense.

Clubs 
His previous club was Busan I'Park in South Korea, Ceará, Icasa, Salgueiro, América de Natal, Santa Cruz, Fluminense and Al Shabab Al Arabi Club  .

Career statistics
.

External links
 
 
 
 

1982 births
Brazilian footballers
Brazilian expatriate footballers
Association football midfielders
Living people
Expatriate footballers in South Korea
Santa Cruz Futebol Clube players
Brazilian expatriate sportspeople in Portugal
Campeonato Brasileiro Série A players
Campeonato Brasileiro Série B players
Campeonato Brasileiro Série D players
Salgueiro Atlético Clube players
Busan IPark players
K League 1 players
Fluminense FC players
Ceará Sporting Club players
Villa Rio Esporte Clube players
América Futebol Clube (RN) players
Sport Club Corinthians Alagoano players
Agremiação Sportiva Arapiraquense players
F.C. Paços de Ferreira players
Al Shabab Al Arabi Club Dubai players
Al Ahli Club (Dubai) players
Al-Ittihad Kalba SC players
Dibba FC players
Brazilian expatriate sportspeople in South Korea
Brazilian expatriate sportspeople in the United Arab Emirates
People from Caruaru
UAE Pro League players
Sportspeople from Pernambuco
Caucaia Esporte Clube players
Sampaio Corrêa Futebol Clube players
Tombense Futebol Clube players